The Family Journal is a peer-reviewed academic journal that publishes papers four times a year in the field of Psychology. The journal's editor is Stephen Southern (Mississippi College). It has been in publication since 1993 and is currently published by SAGE Publications.

Scope 
The Family Journal aims to advance the theory, research and practice of counseling with couples and families from a family systems perspective. The journal publishes articles which address current issues, innovative methods and professional concerns. The Family Journal also contains case studies, interviews and literature reviews.

Abstracting and Indexing 
The Family Journal is abstracted and indexed in the following databases:

•Clarivate Analytics: Emerging Sources Citation Index (ESCI) 
•Collectanea Personal Edition
•Corporate ResourceNET - Ebsco
•Current Citations Express
•EBSCO: Family Studies Abstracts
•Family & Society Studies Worldwide (NISC)
•MAS FullTEXT
•MasterFILE - Ebsco
•NISC
•PsycINFO
•PsycLIT
•Psychological Abstracts
•SafetyLit
•Scopus
•Social Services Abstracts
•Sociological Abstracts
•Standard Periodical Directory (SPD)
•TOPICsearch - Ebsco

External links 
 

SAGE Publishing academic journals
English-language journals
Family therapy journals
Psychotherapy journals